The La Frontera Formation (K2F, Ksf) is a geological formation, part of the Villeta Group, of the Altiplano Cundiboyacense and neighbouring areas of the Eastern Ranges of the Colombian Andes.

Fossils of Yaguarasaurus columbianus were said to be found in this formation (listed as "La Frontera Member"), although the geological mapping of the area state the time-equivalent Hondita Formation as the stratigraphic unit present in the Quebradas El Ocal and Itaibe in Huila. The La Frontera Formation does not outcrop south of Cundinamarca. A high diversity of ammonites has been found in the La Frontera Formation.

Etymology 
The formation was first described by Hubach in 1931 and elevated to formation in 1969 by Cáceres and Etayo. The formation is named after the quarry La Frontera near Albán, Cundinamarca.

Description

Lithologies 
The La Frontera Formation is characterised by a lower part consisting of limestones and an upper part comprising lydites.

Stratigraphy and depositional environment 
The La Frontera Formation overlies the Simijaca Formation and is overlain by the Conejo Formation, all units belong to the Villeta Group. The age has been estimated to be Turonian. Stratigraphically, the formation is time equivalent with the Chipaque, Hondita and La Luna Formations. The formation has been deposited in an open marine platform to submarine fan setting. The deposition is represented by a maximum flooding surface. The formation contains concretions and a high diversity of ammonites; Wrightoceras munieri, Vascoceras cf. constrictum, Vascoceras cf. venezolanum, Kamerunoceras sp., Kamerunoceras cf. turoniense, Hoplitoides cf. lagiraldae, Codazziceras ospinae, Coilopoceras cf. newelli, Hoplitoides wohltmanni, Neoptychites crassus, Hoplitoides ingens, Mammites sp., ?Fagesia sp., and Prionocycloceras sp. Also the bivalves Anomia colombiana and Inoceramus sp. have been found in the La Frontera Formation.

Yaguarasaurus 

Outcrops 

The La Frontera Formation is apart from its type locality, found at surface in the north of the Bogotá savanna, in the Tabio anticlinal, along the road Ubaté-Carmen de Carupa, north and east of Chiquinquirá, south of Cachipay, to a thin band east of Viotá.

Regional correlations

See also 

 Geology of the Eastern Hills
 Geology of the Ocetá Páramo
 Geology of the Altiplano Cundiboyacense

References

Bibliography

Maps La Frontera Fm. proper

Maps Yaguarasaurus locations

External links 
 

Geologic formations of Colombia
Cretaceous Colombia
Upper Cretaceous Series of South America
Turonian Stage
Limestone formations
Deep marine deposits
Open marine deposits
Fossiliferous stratigraphic units of South America
Paleontology in Colombia
Formations
Geography of Cundinamarca Department
Geography of Boyacá Department